Ujjivan Small Finance Bank Limited is an Indian small finance bank based in Bangalore, which commenced operations on 1 February 2017. Ujjivan Financial Services holds an 80 percent stake in the bank.

Ujjivan Small Finance Bank is licensed under Section 22 (1) of the Banking Regulation Act, 1949 to carry out small finance bank business and received Scheduled Bank status from the Reserve Bank of India in August 2017.

History 
On 7 October 2015, Ujjivan Financial Services received an in-principle approval from the Reserve Bank of India to set up a small finance bank. At the time, the company already serviced over 2.6 million customers from 464 branches in 24 states. The small finance bank status provided the opportunity to expand Ujjivan's range of loan products, and also to accept deposits rather than relying on other financial institutions to provide funds for the loans. Ujjivan received the final license from the Reserve Bank of India on 11 November 2016 to set up a small finance bank. By February 2018, Ujjivan was present across 24 states and union territories, 209 districts in India, catering to over 3.7 million customers.

In October 2019, Ujjivan Small Finance Bank received approval from the Securities and Exchange Board of India to raise ₹1,200 crores (US$ million) in an initial public offering (IPO). The IPO was 166 times oversubscribed by the final day of bidding, 4 December 2019.

Services 
Ujjivan SFB provides a range of products and services such as savings account, current account, fixed deposits (FD), recurring deposits (RD), Micro Loans, Home Loans & Small Business Loans.
The bank also offers internet banking, phone banking and mobile banking facilities to customers. Ujjivan SFB ATM is biometric enabled, thereby enabling customers to withdraw money through biometric authentication. Customers can open their bank account in 5–7 minutes on a hand-held device through Aadhaar enabled KYC. The bank has introduced Senior Citizen Product and Tax Saver Fixed Deposit.

See also

 Banking in India
 List of banks in India
 Reserve Bank of India
 Small finance bank
 Indian Financial System Code
 List of largest banks
 List of companies of India
 Make in India

References

External links 
 

Companies based in Bangalore
Banks established in 2017
Small finance banks
Indian companies established in 2017
Private sector banks in India
2017 establishments in Karnataka
Companies listed on the National Stock Exchange of India
Companies listed on the Bombay Stock Exchange